Rochester High School may refer to:

Rochester High School (Illinois), Rochester, Illinois
Rochester High School (Michigan), Rochester, Michigan
Rochester High School (Vermont), Rochester, Vermont
Rochester High School (Washington), Rochester, Washington
Rochester Adams High School, Rochester, Michigan
Rochester Area High School (Pennsylvania), Rochester, Pennsylvania
Rochester Area Learning Center, Rochester, Minnesota
Rochester Community High School, Rochester, Indiana
Rochester Off-Campus Charter High School, Rochester, Minnesota
Old Rochester Regional High School, Mattapoisett, Massachusetts
Aquinas Institute of Rochester, Rochester, New York
East Rochester Junior-Senior High School, East Rochester, New York